Zhongzhou or Zhong Prefecture (忠州) may refer to:

Ancient Chinese places
Zhongzhou, a former prefecture in roughly modern Zhong County, Chongqing, China
Zhongzhou, a former prefecture in roughly modern Ding'an County, Hainan, China
Zhongzhou, a former prefecture in roughly modern Fusui County, Guangxi, China
Zhongzhou, a former prefecture in roughly modern Shanyin County, Shanxi, China
Zhongzhou, a former prefecture in roughly modern Donglan County, Guangxi, China

Chinese townships
 Zhongzhou, Yueyang, a township in Yueyang County, Hunan.

See also
Chungju (Korean equivalent)
Haojing, also known as Zongzhou, the Western Zhou capital